Serine/threonine-protein kinase TAO1 is an enzyme that in humans is encoded by the TAOK1 gene.

Clinical significance
Mutations of the TAOK1 gene cause developmental delay with or without intellectual impairment or behavioral abnormalities (DDIB), a condition first described in 2019.

References

Further reading